Chancery may refer to:

Offices and administration
 Chancery (diplomacy), the principal office that houses a diplomatic mission or an embassy
 Chancery (medieval office), responsible for the production of official documents
 Chancery (Scotland), the keeper of the Quarter Seal, a senior position in the legal system of Scotland
 Diocesan chancery, administration branch in the official government of a Catholic or Anglican diocese
 Apostolic Chancery, an office of the Roman Curia

Writing and printing
 Chancery Standard, of Late Middle English writing
 Chancery hand, either of two distinct styles of historical handwriting
 ITC Zapf Chancery, a family of typefaces

Other uses
 Chancery, Ceredigion, a village in Wales
 the name of several professional wrestling holds

See also 

 Chancellery (disambiguation)
 Central Chancery of the Orders of Knighthood, British office that deals with administration of Orders of Chivalry 
 Court of Chancery (disambiguation), several uses
 Court of Chancery, the chief court of equity in England and Wales until 1873
 Court of equity, or chancery court